Aime Mäemets  (29 September 1930 - 17 July 1996) was an Estonian botanist and hydrobiologist. She conducted considerable research into Lake Peipsi and was known for her study of Macrophytes. She finished University of Tartu in 1954. From 1961 to 1996 she worked in Estonian Institute of Zoology and Botany and was a well-known specialist of Potamogetonaceae plants.

External links
Lake Peipsi study

20th-century Estonian botanists
Estonian microbiologists
1930 births
1996 deaths
University of Tartu alumni
Women microbiologists
20th-century Estonian women scientists